USS Thomas Hudner (DDG-116) is an . The $663 million contract to build her was awarded on 28 February 2012, to Bath Iron Works, of Bath, Maine. On 7 May 2012, Secretary of the Navy, Ray Mabus, announced the ship name would be named Thomas Hudner in honor of U.S. naval aviator Thomas Hudner, who was awarded the Medal of Honor for his actions in trying to save the life of his wingman, Ensign Jesse L. Brown, during the Battle of Chosin Reservoir, in the Korean War.

Construction and design
Thomas Hudner is the 66th ship of the Arleigh Burke class of destroyers, the first of which, was commissioned in July 1991. As an Arleigh Burke-class ship, Thomas Hudners roles included anti-aircraft, anti-submarine, and anti-surface warfare, as well as strike operations. During its long production run, the class was built in three flights—Flight I (DDG-51–DDG-71), Flight II (DDG-72–DDG-78), and Flight IIA (DDG-79– ). Thomas Hudner is to be a "Technology Insertion" ship with elements of the next generation of Arleigh Burke class destroyers, called Flight III, and Flight III proper is planned to start with 
DDG-125.

The first three ships (DDG-113—DDG-115) ordered following the product decision are known as the "restart" ships, while "technology insertion" ships (DDG-116—DDG-123) are expected to incorporate certain elements of Arleigh Burke class Flight III, which in turn is planned to run from DDG-125 onwards.

Thomas Hudners keel was laid on 16 November 2015. Her christening took place on 1 April 2017, and she was launched three weeks later, on 23 April. She completed acceptance trials 3 May 2018, and on 15 June 2018, the Navy accepted delivery of Thomas Hudner from shipbuilder General Dynamics Bath Iron Works.
Thomas Hudner was commissioned on 1 December 2018, in Boston, Massachusetts.

Service history
, Thomas Hudners home port is Naval Station Mayport, Florida.

From July to August 2020, Thomas Hudner participated in Operation Nanook alongside vessels from the Canadian, French, & Danish navies.

On 20 February 2021, Thomas Hudner embarked on her maiden deployment, traveling over  before returning to her home port on 17 July 2021.  During her deployment, she made transits to the Black Sea, operated in the Mediterranean Sea with the French aircraft carrier Charles de Gaulle and her battlegroup, and also took part in the annual BALTOPS exercise with NATO allies.

In September 2021, Thomas Hudner, along with her sister ship , participated in "Operation Cutlass Fury" with the Canadian and French navies. Later that month, she became a part of the newly formed Task Group Greyhound.

They arrived at Portsmouth, England, on 14 November 2022.

References

External links

 

Arleigh Burke-class destroyers
2017 ships